Sloe Gin is the sixth studio album by American blues rock musician Joe Bonamassa. Produced by Kevin Shirley, it was released on August 21, 2007 by J&R Adventures and topped the US Billboard Top Blues Albums chart. The title of the album is a reference to the song of the same name by English musician Tim Curry from his 1978 debut album Read My Lips.

Reception

Music website Allmusic gave Sloe Gin four out of five stars, with reviewer Steve Leggett claiming that the album showed how Bonamassa had "stepped up his songwriting ... and cut way down on his clichés, delivering in the process his most varied and impressive album yet".

Track listing

Chart performance

Personnel

Musical performers
Joe Bonamassa – guitars, vocals
Carmine Rojas – bass
Anton Fig – drums, percussion
Rick Melick – keyboards, tabla
Bogie Bowles – hammered dulcimer, drums on "Seagull"

Additional personnel
Jeff Bova – orchestration
The Bovaland Symphonic Orchestra – strings
Kevin Shirley – production, mixing
Jared Kvitka – engineering
Ryan Smith – mastering

References

2007 albums
Joe Bonamassa albums
Albums produced by Kevin Shirley